This is a top 50 most popular Android apps in the United States by Similarweb Usage Rank, for February 2023. This list is updated and published monthly, and is available online.
Usage Rank is based on an algorithm that factors in both on active users metrics and current installs data for a relevant country or category. This list is also published for all categories and countries.

List

See also 
 List of most-downloaded Google Play applications
 List of most downloaded iOS applications

References 

 
Smartphone applications, Most Downloaded